Guinan Khairy was a Bashkir poet, writer and playwright.

In 1937, he was arrested for views on the protection of the people. He was rehabilitated posthumously, only in the late 1990s.

Creation

In 1927 he worked as an editor of the newspaper Bashkortostan yeshtere (Youth of Bashkortostan).

References

1903 births
1938 deaths
Soviet poets
Socialist realism writers
Bashkir writers
Bashkir-language poets